Yarkand toad-headed agama (Phrynocephalus axillaris), is a species of agamid lizard found in Turkestan, Mongolia, and Tibet.

References

axillaris
Reptiles described in 1875
Taxa named by William Thomas Blanford